Radim Kucharczyk (born October 24, 1979) is a Czech professional ice hockey player who played with HC Olomouc in the Czech Extraliga.

He previously played for HC Vsetín, HC Šumperk, Ilves Tampere, HC Oceláři Třinec, HC Karlovy Vary, HC Kladno, HC Znojmo, HC Slovan Bratislava and HC Kometa Brno.

References

External links

1979 births
Living people
HC Slovan Bratislava players
Czech ice hockey forwards
HC Kometa Brno players
VHK Vsetín players
Rytíři Kladno players
HC Karlovy Vary players
People from Vsetín
Sportspeople from the Zlín Region
Czech expatriate ice hockey players in Finland
Czech expatriate ice hockey players in Slovakia